Fukuia ooyagii is a species of freshwater snail which has an operculum, an aquatic gastropod mollusk in the family Pomatiopsidae.

Taxonomy 
According to the molecular analyses of 18S ribosomal RNA, 28S ribosomal RNA, 16S ribosomal RNA, and cytochrome-c oxidase I (COI) genes by Kameda & Kato (2011) Fukuia ooyagii should be separated from Fukuia, and its generic assignment should be determined coupled with the investigation of its soft-part morphology. The most closely related genus is Blanfordia.

Distribution 
This species is endemic to the northern part of Honshu, Japan.

Ecology 
This species is freshwater snail living in mountain streamlets.

References 
This article incorporates CC-BY-2.0 text from the reference

External links 

Pomatiopsidae
Gastropods described in 1982